Pittosporum raivavaeense is a species of plant in the Pittosporaceae family. It is endemic to French Polynesia.

References

raivavaeense
Endemic flora of French Polynesia
Critically endangered flora of Oceania
Taxonomy articles created by Polbot